Ferenc Kun (24 August 1930 – 6 March 2009) was a Hungarian sports shooter. He competed in the 25 metre pistol event at the 1960 Summer Olympics.

References

1930 births
2009 deaths
Hungarian male sport shooters
Olympic shooters of Hungary
Shooters at the 1960 Summer Olympics
Sport shooters from Budapest